Protorugosa is a genus of large, air-breathing land snails, pulmonate gastropods in the family Rhytididae, first described by Michael Shea & Owen Griffiths in 2010. This snail is endemic to New South Wales.

Species
 Protorugosa alpica (Iredale, 1943)
 Protorugosa burraga Shea & O. L. Griffiths, 2010

References

 Stanisic, J.; Shea, M.; Potter, D.; Griffiths, O. (2010). Australian land snails. Volume 1. A field guide to eastern Australian species. Queensland Museum, Brisbane. 596 pp.
 Bank, R. A. (2017). Classification of the Recent terrestrial Gastropoda of the World. Last update: July 16th, 2017

Rhytididae
Taxa described in 2010